State Route 61 (SR-61) is a nearly  state highway in Cache County, Utah, connecting SR-23 in Cornish,  to U.S. Route 91 (US-91) in Cove via Lewiston, in the extreme northern part of the state. The highway has existed since at least 1914 and as SR-61 since at least 1937. Between 735 and 2,180 vehicles travel along the highway on an average day in 2012.

Route description

At the intersection of SR-23 (4800 West) and 13400 North in the center of Cornish, SR-61 departs east on 13400 North due east, crossing over a single track belonging to the Union Pacific Railroad (UP). Exiting Cornish, the highway crosses the Bear River and continues east through rural Cache County. Just shy of the western city limits of Lewiston, the highway intersects SR-200 (800 West), a connector road to Preston, Idaho.

The highway's name changes from 13400 South to Center Street through Lewiston. Passing the Lewiston Cemetery, SR-61 crosses over the Cub River and a second single track belonging to UP, and then a third UP single track just before the highway's eastern terminus at US-91 north of Richmond. All of the rail lines that SR-61 crosses originally belonged to the Oregon Short Line Railway. Aside from the segment through Lewiston, the highway is surrounded by farmland for its entire journey across northern Utah.

Every year, UDOT conducts a series of surveys on its highways in the state to measure traffic volume. This is expressed in terms of average annual daily traffic (AADT), a measure of traffic volume for any average day of the year. In 2012, UDOT calculated that as few as 735 vehicles used the highway on an average day at its western terminus in Cornish, and as many as 2,180 vehicles used the highway at its junction with SR-200. Thirty-five percent of this was truck traffic.

History
A roadway linking Cornish to the east has existed since at least 1914. The roadway that serves as the eastern terminus was numbered SR-1 by 1927, and the highway officially was designated SR-61 in 1931. The  bridge that carries SR-61 over the Cub River today was constructed in 1952, while the  bridge over the Bear River was built in 1961. The original river crossings were slightly further south than their current locations. Until 1953, SR-61 continued north to the Idaho border. This section was replaced by SR-23 in 1953.

Major intersections

See also

 List of state highways in Utah

References

External links

061
 061
State Route 61